"Ona to zna" is the fourth and last single by Serbian band Idoli. The single was given as a present with Džuboks magazine issue. The song appeared on the Šest dana juna soundtrack album. A live version of the song appeared on the Vlada Divljan live album Odbrana i zaštita.

Track listing 

 "Ona to zna" (2:55)
 "Ljubavi" (3:35)

Personnel 

 Vlada Divljan (guitar, vocals)
 Srđan Šaper (vocals, backing vocals)
 Zdenko Kolar (bass)
 Branko Isaković (bass)
 Ivan Stančić Piko (drums)
 Boban Đorđević (drums)
 Đorđe Petrović (keyboards) 
 Dragan Ilić (keyboards)
 Dragomir Mihajlović Gagi (guitar)
 Vuk Vujačić (saxophone)

External links 

 EX YU ROCK enciklopedija 1960-2006,  Janjatović Petar;  

1985 singles
Idoli songs
Songs written by Vlada Divljan
Jugoton singles
1985 songs